Norman Grant (15 January 1891 – 17 September 1966) was an Australian cricketer. He played in one first-class match for Queensland in 1926/27.

See also
 List of Queensland first-class cricketers

References

External links
 

1891 births
1966 deaths
Australian cricketers
Queensland cricketers
Cricketers from Sydney